Dhiraj Rai also known as Stage King is a singer, musician and songwriter from Khotang, Nepal. Rai's first recorded song is ‘Luki Luki’.

Career

Rai started his career in 1990. Generally, his songs are based on love using the conventions of pop and rock. His popular album are ‘Premi’, ‘Prithak’, ‘Buddha Born in Nepal’. 

He has sung an unplugged version of his solo song "Himal Najhuke Samma".

Discography

Albums
Buddha Was Born in Nepal
Freedom
Prithak

Selected songs

References

21st-century Nepalese male singers
Nepalese songwriters
Living people
Year of birth missing (living people)
20th-century Nepalese male singers
Nepalese rock singers
Rai people